Piazza Navona is a public open space in Rome, Italy. It is built on the site of the Stadium of Domitian, built in the 1st century AD, and follows the form of the open space of the stadium. The ancient Romans went there to watch the agones ("games"), and hence it was known as "Circus Agonalis" ("competition arena"). It is believed that over time the name changed to in avone to navone and eventually to navona.

History

The space currently occupied by the Piazza Navona was originally the Stadium of Domitian, built by Emperor Titus Flavius Domitianus in 80 AD. Following the Fall of the Western Roman Empire, the stadium fell into ruin, being quarried for building materials. Very little of it remains today. 

Defined as a public space in the last years of 15th century, when the city market was transferred there from the Campidoglio, Piazza Navona was transformed into a highly significant example of Baroque Roman architecture and art during the pontificate of Innocent X, who reigned from 1644 until 1655, and whose family palace, the Palazzo Pamphili, faced the piazza. It features important sculptural creations: in the centre stands the famous Fontana dei Quattro Fiumi or Fountain of the Four Rivers (1651) by Gian Lorenzo Bernini, topped by the Obelisk of Domitian, brought in pieces from the Circus of Maxentius; the church of Sant'Agnese in Agone by Francesco Borromini, Girolamo Rainaldi, Carlo Rainaldi and others; and the aforementioned Pamphili palace, also by Girolamo Rainaldi, that accommodates the long gallery designed by Borromini and frescoed by Pietro da Cortona.

Piazza Navona has two other fountains. At the southern end is the Fontana del Moro with a basin and four Tritons sculpted by Giacomo della Porta (1575) to which, in 1673, Bernini added a statue of a Moor, wrestling with a dolphin. At the northern end is the Fountain of Neptune (1574) also created by Giacomo della Porta; the statue of Neptune, by Antonio Della Bitta, was added in 1878 to create a balance with La Fontana del Moro.
 
During its history, the piazza has hosted theatrical events and other ephemeral activities. From 1652 until 1866, when the festival was suppressed, it was flooded on every Saturday and Sunday in August in elaborate celebrations of the Pamphili family. The pavement level was raised in the 19th century, and in 1869 the market was moved to the nearby Campo de' Fiori. A Christmas market is held in the piazza square.

Other monuments
 Stabilimenti Spagnoli
 Palazzo de Cupis
 Palazzo Torres Massimo Lancellotti
 Church of Nostra Signora del Sacro Cuore
 Palazzo Braschi (Museo di Roma)
 Sant'Agnese in Agone

Literature and films

The piazza is featured in Dan Brown's 2000 thriller Angels & Demons, in which the Fontana dei Quattro Fiumi is listed as one of the Altars of Science. During June 2008, Ron Howard directed several scenes of the film adaptation of Angels & Demons on the southern section of the piazza.
The piazza is featured in several scenes of director Mike Nichols' 1970 adaptation of Joseph Heller's novel, Catch-22.
The Fontana dei Quattro Fiumi was used in the 1990 film Coins in the Fountain. The characters threw coins into the fountain as they made wishes. The Trevi Fountain was used in the 1954 version of the film.
It is featured in National Lampoon's European Vacation 
In the 1964 Italian comedy film Yesterday, Today and Tomorrow ("ieri, oggi, domani") Sophia Loren's character Mara lives in a second-floor apartment overlooking Piazza Navona in Rome.
The piazza is featured in Eugene Levy's film, Once Upon A Crime.
The piazza is featured in the 2017 film American Assassin.
The piazza is featured in scenes in the 1999 film The Talented Mr. Ripley.

Vandalism
In the early hours of 3 September 2011, the Fontana del Moro was damaged by a vandal. Police later found the man, who had been captured on security cameras climbing in the fountain, wielding a large rock and decapitating some of the larger and smaller figures, after they recognised him by his shoes.

See also
Obeliscus Pamphilius

Notes

References

External links
 
 Virtual Tour of Piazza Navona
 Bernini Fountains Video Introduction
High-resolution 360° Panoramas and Images of Piazza Navona | Art Atlas
 Piazza Navona audio guide,
 
 

Navona
Baroque architecture in Rome
Sculptures by Gian Lorenzo Bernini
Rome R. VI Parione